Getsunova is a Thai band under GMM Grammy, composed of , Natee Osathanugrah, Panoth Khunprasert and Komkadech Sangwattanaroj. The band has been known for their popular hits such as "ไกลแค่ไหนคือใกล้" (Glai Kae Nai Kue Glai) (2012), "คำถามซึ่งไร้คนตอบ" (Kham Tham Seung Rai Khon Tob) (2013), "อยู่ตรงนี้ นานกว่านี้" (Yoo Trong Nee Naan Kwa Nee) (2014) and "พระเอกจำลอง" (Pra Ek Jum Laung) (2019).

History 
, the heir of the  restaurant owner and a former soloist from GMM Grammy, invited his friends studying in the United Kingdom namely Natee Osathanugrah and Panoth Khunprasert, who also happen to be sons of tycoons, to form a band. Panoth later invited his friend, Komkadech Sangwattanaroj, to be the band's drummer. The band's name was formed by combining two words: "Getsu" which means moon in Japanese and "Nova" which is a nuclear explosion in a white dwarf star in English.

Initially, the band began rehearsing their music while studying in different locations: Prakarn and Panoth in the United Kingdom, Natee in the United States and Komkadech in Thailand. While this proved to be a challenge, they continued to produce their music through the internet. When the band members graduated, they eventually settled in Thailand to work together.

As the band released the song "ไกลแค่ไหนคือใกล้" (Glai Kae Nai Kue Glai) in 2012, it became a number one hit making them the first Thai band to reach 100 million views for three songs on YouTube, including "คำถามซึ่งไร้คนตอบ" (Rearrange) and "อยู่ตรงนี้ นานกว่านี้" (Yoo Trong Nee Naan Kwa Nee), and later, for reaching 200 million views for "ไกลแค่ไหนคือใกล้" (Glai Kae Nai Kue Glai).

Despite producing songs for several years already, it was only in 2016 when the band released their debut album dubbed as "The First Album".

An early producer of the band was Scott Moffatt. Scott was Producer of the Year at the 2007 Seed Awards for his work with Slot Machine. Producer of The Year in 2008 at the Thai Headbanger Awards for his work with Brand New Sunset and Producer of the Year in 2020 at the CMA, CCMA, ACM Awards as producer of Country Superstar Luke Combs. To this date Scott considers his time spent with Getsunova as one of his favorite projects, and a great bunch of guys.

Members 
 (Name) – lead vocals
Natee Osathanugrah – guitar
Panoth Khunprasert (Noth) – guitar, synthesizers
Komkadech Sangwattanaroj (Prite) – drums

Discography

Studio albums

EP

Singles

Other songs

References

External links 
 
 

2008 establishments in Thailand
Thai pop music groups